The Fifth Column and the First Forty-Nine Stories is an anthology of writings by Ernest Hemingway published by Scribner's on October 14, 1938. It contains Hemingway's only full-length play, The Fifth Column, and 49 short stories.

Many of the stories included in the collection appear in other collections, including In Our Time, Men Without Women, Winner Take Nothing and The Snows of Kilimanjaro.

Contents
The Fifth Column is set during the Spanish Civil War.  Its main character, Philip Rawlings, is an American-born secret agent for the Second Spanish Republic. The play was poorly received upon publication and has been overshadowed by many of the short stories in the anthology. 

The play was slated for production in 1938, but setbacks with the Broadway producers delayed production. In 1940 a version of the play was produced on Broadway by the Theater Guild. This production was heavily edited by Benjamin Glazer with significant revisions to the script. Hemingway disliked these changes and attempted to have his name removed from the production. This production ran for 87 performances. The play wasn't professionally produced with Hemingway's original script until 2008 when Mint Theater Company staged the play.

Among the short stories, the book includes Hemingway's previous volumes and added his latest published works "The Short Happy Life of Francis Macomber", "The Snows of Kilimanjaro", "The Capital of the World" and "Old Man at the Bridge" as well as his very first writing, "Up in Michigan".

Latest writings (1938)
 "The Short Happy Life of Francis Macomber"
 "The Capital of the World"
 "The Snows of Kilimanjaro"
 "Old Man at the Bridge"

Early writing (1921)
 "Up in Michigan"

In Our Time (1925)
 "On the Quai at Smyrna"
 "Indian Camp" 
 "The Doctor and the Doctor's Wife"
 "The End of Something" 
 "The Three-Day Blow"
 "The Battler"
 "A Very Short Story"
 "Soldier's Home"
 "The Revolutionist" 
 "Mr. and Mrs. Elliot"
 "Cat in the Rain"
 "Out of Season"
 "Cross-Country Snow" 
 "My Old Man"
 "Big Two-Hearted River" (part 1)
 "Big Two-Hearted River" (part 2)

Men Without Women (1927)
 "The Undefeated" 
 "In Another Country" 
 "Hills Like White Elephants" 
 "The Killers"
 "Che Ti Dice La Patria?" 
 "Fifty Grand"
 "A Simple Enquiry"
 "Ten Indians" 
 "A Canary for One" 
 "An Alpine Idyll"
 "A Pursuit Race" 
 "Today is Friday"
 "Banal Story" 
 "Now I Lay Me"

Winner Take Nothing (1933)
 "After the Storm"
 "A Clean, Well-Lighted Place"
 "The Light of the World" 
 "God Rest You Merry, Gentlemen" 
 "The Sea Change" 
 "A Way You'll Never Be" 
 "The Mother of a Queen" 
 "One Reader Writes"
 "Homage to Switzerland" 
 "A Day's Wait" 
 "A Natural History of the Dead" 
 "Wine of Wyoming" 
 "The Gambler, the Nun, and the Radio"
 "Fathers and Sons"

Notes

References 

1938 short story collections
Charles Scribner's Sons books
Short story collections by Ernest Hemingway